AMF Xtreme Bowling 2006 (known as AMF Xtreme Bowling in North America) is a 2006 bowling video game released for the PlayStation 2 and Xbox.

Reception

The game holds a 30% rating on Metacritic for the PS2 version of the game and a 34% rating for the Xbox version of the game.

GamerFeed rate the PS2 version of the game a 1.5 of 5 stating "AMF Xtreme Bowling 2006 tries so hard to be liked, but it's trying in too few areas. It goes more for the flash-in-the-pan presentation rather than on the gameplay, where it struggles completely by being merely nothing at all. Had more emphasis been on the actual bowling, its physics, and the fun of multiplayer, we would be getting somewhere. As is, the game's just a flash-in-the-pan cheaper title that even bowling zealots should avoid. Just do the real thing instead" 

IGN gave the game a 2 of 10 stating "With graphics and sound that do nothing to enhance the package, AMF Xtreme Bowling 2006 isn't just a gutter ball, it's tossing a shot seven lanes over and crashing it through the floor"

Jon Miller of IGN listed the game at number 9 of his personal favorite games of 2006.

References

2006 video games
Bowling video games
PlayStation 2 games
Video games developed in the United Kingdom
Xbox games
Mud Duck Productions games
Multiplayer and single-player video games